Fuzzy-Felt is a simple fabric toy intended for young children, first sold in 1950. The toys consist of a flocked backing board onto which a number of felt shapes are placed to create different pictures. Felt pieces can be simple silhouettes or more detailed printed shapes. For a farmyard scene, for example, auxiliary pieces would typically be cows, sheep, chickens, horses, cats, dogs, a farmer, and a tractor. Other scenes might include hospital, pets, vehicles. Fuzzy-Felt is for children over the age of three years, as the pieces may present a choking hazard.

History
Fuzzy-Felt was invented by Lois Allan (d. Farnham Common 1989) during World War II, although similar products had existed pre-war, for example Kiddicraft K100 'Pictures in Felt' of 1937. Born Lois Day, she was an American. She studied art and fashion in Paris in the 1920s. She married a Scotsman and Great War RAF Captain, Peter Allan, and moved to Vine Cottage in Farnham Common in Buckinghamshire in the United Kingdom, where the couple ran a travel agency and other entrepreneurial pursuits including printing cruise ships on cigarette cases. 

During the Second World War, Peter’s son, Lois’s step-son, Anthony Murray Allan, also known as Jock or Peter, was captured by the Germans, escaping from a prison camp as part of the Laufen 6, but was recaptured and sent to Colditz, where he daringly escaped inside a mattress, only to be recaptured in Austria.

During the Second World War, Peter and Lois Allan contributed to the war effort by manufacturing felt gaskets for sealing components in tanks in the outbuildings of her home. Other women were involved in this work, and the Allans ran a creche for their children. She was inspired to create the toy after observing how much enjoyment children had taking the discarded and misshaped pieces of felt and sticking them to the backs of table mats. Product development following the end of the War took a few years, but after gaining the interest of toy buyers at John Lewis and Heals, Allan was able to bring Fuzzy-Felt to market in 1950, later founding Allan Industries Ltd.

Production continued at Allan's home, Vine Cottage, until 1972, when the business relocated to larger premises in the Cressex Estate in High Wycombe. In 1996 the business was bought by Mandolyn Ltd in a management buy-out, and production continued in High Wycombe until increasing manufacturing costs led to the licensing of the Fuzzy-Felt brand to a much larger UK toy manufacturer and wholesalers, Toy Brokers Ltd of Huntingdon. In 2001, via his holding company, Mr Douglas Ware a Buckinghamshire based businessman acquired a controlling interest in Mandolyn Ltd. This holding company became 100% owner of Mandolyn Ltd and Fuzzy-Felt Ltd in 2012. In 2011, Toy Brokers Ltd had in turn been bought by John Adams Leisure Ltd who then became the licensee of the Fuzzy-Felt brand for Toy products.

As of 2016, an estimated 26.25 million sets of Fuzzy-felt had been sold internationally. Although Fuzzy-Felt reached its peak in popularity sometime in the mid-1970s, it remains an iconic children's toy, still enjoyed by children who play with it and parents who nostalgically purchase it.

Popularity

Many reasons have been attributed to Fuzzy-Felt’s popularity. Though seemingly simple, the various available themed sets allow for hours of creativity. Though the sets started out strictly as a collection of various coloured shapes, countless themes Fuzzy-Felt sets became available through the years. “Ballet, Farmyard, Circus, Hospital, and much later on Thomas the Tank Engine, Noddy, and My Little Pony were released to inspire [a child’s] picture-making” abilities.

Fuzzy-Felt was also a favoured toy in Sunday schools because of its “Bible Stories set, complete with camels and three kings.”

The quiet toy was, and still is, fairly cheap, can be played almost anywhere leaving little mess, save a few stray pieces of shaped felt behind, making it a popular choice among parents.

In popular culture

Fashion
In 2008, fashion designer Stella McCartney used a “ 7-meter high, 14-meter wide” Fuzzy-Felt backdrop, created by artists Jake and Dinos Chapman, as a visual accent for the debut of her 2008 spring/summer collection in Paris. The backdrop was made up of “rainbow-coloured rabbits, giraffes and a particularly anxious ladybird”, all reminiscent of the 1970s child’s toy.

Literature
In Jeanette Winterson's novel Oranges Are Not the Only Fruit, the protagonist Jess uses Fuzzy-Felt to depict Bible scenes, one of which is a rewrite of Daniel in the lions' den. She depicts Daniel as getting eaten by the lions, and when confronted by the pastor tries to disguise this by saying that she 'wanted to do Jonah and the whale, but they don't do whales in Fuzzy-Felt'. The pastor then tells Jess that they should do the Astonishment at Dawn scene, and Jess remarks to herself that this is 'hopeless... Susan Green was sick on the tableau of the three Wise Men at Christmas, and you only get three kings to a box'.

Music
Fuzzy-Felt Folk is a collection of “rare, delightful folk oddities for strange adults and maybe their children too… The front cover imagery of the album is from the original 1968 Fuzzy-Felt Fantasy set.”

Current
Fuzzy-Felt toy products are currently sold by John Adams Leisure Ltd of Huntingdon, under license from Fuzzy-Felt Ltd and Mandolyn Ltd. There is a UK registered trade mark (number 2461883) for "Fuzzy-Felt", registered to a non-trading UK company (number 03227732) "Fuzzy-Felt Ltd". In 2017 Fuzzy-Felt was commemorated with a special stamp from the Royal Mail, which was celebrating 10 of the most iconic and much-loved British toys from the last 100 years. Fuzzy-Felt was amongst the top ten classic toys chosen. Even after nearly 70 years, Fuzzy-Felt continues to evoke feelings of nostalgia across generations and is still hugely popular throughout the world today.

See also
Flannelgraph or flannel board - generic felt boards used for storytelling and education
Colorforms - similar scene construction sets, applying vinyl cutouts to a vinyl board

References

External links
John Adams's page on Fuzzy-Felt

Art and craft toys
Products introduced in 1950
Buckinghamshire